Lynx (bus) may refer to:

Leyland Lynx - bus manufactured by Leyland between 1986 and 1992
Lynx (bus company) - bus operator in King's Lynn, England
Lynx (Orlando) - public bus system in Orlando, Florida

See also 
Lynx (disambiguation)